Sylvester John Hemleben was born February 25, 1902, in La Crosse, Wisconsin, a descendant of an ancient German family which emigrated to America to practice medicine and pharmacy in pioneer Wisconsin.

Hemleben received the Bachelor of Arts and Master of Arts degrees from the University of Iowa, the Doctor of Philosophy degree in political science from Fordham University, and the Bachelor of Laws With Distinction and the Juris Doctor degrees from the University of Mississippi.  He furthered his education at Columbia University, Harvard University, Cambridge University, England, and Munich University, Germany.

Hemleben’s career was devoted to college and university teaching. For a time he was head of the department of history and social studies in the School of Education at Fordham University. He also taught at the University of Southwest Louisiana, Brevard College, and the University of Mississippi School of Law in the fields of history, law, and political science. Hemleben was a Fellow of the Royal Historical Society. He was the author of numerous books, including Plans for World Peace through Six Centuries (1943, University of Chicago Press), as well as numerous articles in learned journals.  Hemleben also wrote numerous volumes of poetry, including Musings of a Mystic, that are expressive of his philosophy of life.

Hemleben died on June 14, 1991.

References

1902 births
1991 deaths
20th-century American poets
Alumni of the University of Cambridge
Columbia University alumni
Fordham University alumni
Harvard University alumni
Ludwig Maximilian University of Munich alumni
University of Iowa alumni
University of Mississippi alumni
20th-century American non-fiction writers
Fellows of the Royal Historical Society